Renato Leduc (November 16, 1897 – August 2, 1986) was a Mexican poet and journalist.

Biography 

Leduc, son of a French father and a Mexican mother, served as a signalist in Pancho Villa's División del Norte, and studied law at the National Autonomous University of Mexico. He wrote poetry, stories and chronicles for several newspapers and cultural magazines, before he travelled to Paris by order of the Secretaría de Hacienda y Crédito Público in the mid 1930s, where he met several surrealistic writers, and lived for ten years, during World War II. For a short time, he was married to the British artist and writer Leonora Carrington, whom he met in the embassy in Lisbon, on her flight from the Nazis, after they had arrested Max Ernst in France.

Leduc was a good friend of Elena Poniatowska, Federico Cantú Garza, Luis Cardoza y Aragón, Octavio Paz, Agustín Lara and Fernando Leal, to whom he dedicated his sonnet Mixcalco (1925).

María Félix, one of Agustín Lara’s wives, was Leduc’s partner.

Leduc's daughter, Patricia Leduc, is the sole heir of her father's rights and archive.

Selected works 
 El aula, 1929
 Unos cuantos sonetos, 1932
 Algunos poemas deliberadamente románticos, 1933
 Breve glosa al Libro de Buen Amor, 1939
 Versos y poemas, 1940
 Desde París", 1942
 Fabulillas de animales, niños y espantos, 1957
 Catorce poemas burocráticos y un corrido reaccionario, 1963
 Prometeo, la Odisea, Euclidiana, 1968

References

External links 
 

Mexican male poets
Writers from Mexico City
Mexican people of French descent
National Autonomous University of Mexico alumni
1897 births
1986 deaths
20th-century Mexican poets
20th-century Mexican male writers